dreDDup is the fourth official album of Serbian industrial group dreDDup. It was recorded during the period 2008-2010 in DURU studio. The band tried to do something completely different and changed their sound to massacre crossover, abandoning their original sound. This was the first album with the completely new line-up. The album tells a story about dark diary. It was self-titled because the band wanted to complete the story with this release and finish with studio recordings. The artwork was created by the partist Bojana Jarošenko and 91 Design team. It presented the visual explanation of the entire music in the album. This album also included some guest musicians such as Roko of f.O.F, Bojan from KOH, Laura from Talbot's Curse and Bajs from Kleimor. The complete production and studio mastering/mixing was done by miKKa. Album was released for dPulse Recordings in February 2011.

Track listing
 People are Dead – 1:03
 Set Me on Fire – 5:33
 oNe is Alive – 5:17
 Animal Takes Over – 4:12
 When Dead Come Home – 6:15
 Dirt – 6:35
 God of FM Stereo – 5:06
 Mr Fooz – 2:35
 Wheels – 3:49
 Inject the Poison – 4:00
 Garden of Dead Friends – 5:32
 Undo Yourself – 3:58
 Machine – 3:36
 Videotape – 2:43
 Heartbeat Away – 5:01
 Footfalls – 4:04

Personnel
 Mihajlo Obrenov; miKKa – lead vocals, electronics
 Ivan Francuski – drums
 Alen Habek – lead guitar
 Aleksandra Vukosic – bass
 Bojan Petkovic – rhythm guitar
 Roko Katalinic – back vocals
 Sinisa Bajic – back vocals
 Laura Greenwood – back vocals

Production
 miKKa – engineer and remastering
 Gabe Wilkinson – vocals engineer

Sources
 https://www.amazon.com/Dreddup/dp/B004M5TWFI/ref=sr_1_1?ie=UTF8&qid=1299362422&sr=8-1
 http://dpulse-europe.com/store/products/dreDDup-dreDDup.html
 http://www.terapija.net/mjuzik.asp?ID=10485
 http://www.trablmejker.com/emisije/2/1991

References
Horvat, Vladimir (25.02.2011). Svecko, a naše, Terapija

2011 albums
DreDDup albums